Edgardo Díaz Melendez (born 1947) is a Puerto Rican music producer. He is the creator of the "boy band" Menudo.

Early life 
Díaz was born in Panama City, Panama to Puerto Rican parents "Nacho" Diaz and his wife "Panchi", Díaz grew up in Miami, Florida.

Career 
Díaz moved to Spain after graduating from school and he worked with a group that was widely successful, La Pandilla, which had 4 boys and 1 girl, Mari Blanca, (now a Veterinarian in her home country), but after the La Pandilla members grew up, he moved back to the United States, and created Menudo. Díaz managed Menudo from 1977 to the group's era as MDO.

At the time he started to manage Menudo, Diaz was also the director of a young-adult oriented band named "Aquamarina".

In 2004, Díaz signed Daniela Lujan to manage the Mexican singer and actress' career.

Personal 
Diaz was once romantically linked to the Puerto Rican actress and singer Millie Aviles.

Allegations 
In 1991, Diaz was accused by an ex-member of Menudo of sexual abuse on a May 1991 Univisión Television Program "Cristina Show". He denied the allegations. Diaz has been the recipient of several sexual crime allegations by former Menudo members, including Ralphy Rodriguez and Roy Rossello, who accused him of sexual abuse during a Brazilian reality show on 21 October 2014.

On 20 November 2014, Rene Farrait, another former Menudo member, told the Telemundo show Suelta La Sopa: "Unfortunately, there are many people in the communications world that really know what happened (at Menudo) and are playing stupid", when asked about abuse allegations by Diaz. He did not, however, mention anything about sexual abuse against him or his Menudo bandmates. "He (Diaz) knows perfectly what happened there", Farrait told the show.

Former Los Chamos member Gabriel Fernandez, who was allegedly accepted into Menudo once, made similar allegations in 2021.

In popular culture 
Diaz is played by Braulio Castillo, hijo and by Yamil Urena in the 2020 Amazon Prime Video series based on Menudo, "Subete A Mi Moto".

See also

List of Panamanians
List of Americans
List of Puerto Ricans
Lou Pearlman

References

1947 births
Living people
People from Panama City
People from Caguas, Puerto Rico
Menudo (band)